The following is a list of county roads in Gulf County, Florida.  All county roads are maintained by the county in which they reside, although not all routes are marked with standard county road shields.

County roads in Gulf County

References

FDOT Map of Gulf County
FDOT GIS data, accessed January 2014

 
County